The Knight-Wood Home is a home located at 1800 West Littleton Blvd in Littleton, Colorado. It is a one and half story house built in 1925. It was listed on the National Register of Historic Places in 2004.

It was deemed notable as a fine example of a Craftsman-style house, having all five of the identifying features of the type: low-pitched, gabled roofs; "wide, unenclosed eave overhangs; decorative beams or braces under the gables; full or partial porches with roofs supported by square tapered columns; and columns or pedestals that extend to the ground level without a break at the porch level."

A second contributing building in the listing is the original garage.

See also
National Register of Historic Places listings in Arapahoe County, Colorado

References

External links 
 History of Colorado

American Craftsman architecture in Colorado
Houses in Arapahoe County, Colorado
Historic districts on the National Register of Historic Places in Colorado
National Register of Historic Places in Arapahoe County, Colorado